Thruxton could be:

Places
Thruxton, Hampshire
Thruxton, Herefordshire

Other
Thruxton Circuit, a racetrack in Hampshire
Triumph Thruxton 900, a motorcycle
Velocette Thruxton, a motorcycle